Sylwester Kubica (28 December 1949 – 9 June 2018) was a Polish gymnast. He competed at the 1968 Summer Olympics and the 1972 Summer Olympics.

References

1949 births
2018 deaths
Polish male artistic gymnasts
Olympic gymnasts of Poland
Gymnasts at the 1968 Summer Olympics
Gymnasts at the 1972 Summer Olympics
People from Rybnik
Sportspeople from Silesian Voivodeship